Bobby Thompson may refer to:

 Bobby Thompson (American football coach) (born 1937), American football coach and college athletics administrator
 Bobby Thompson (running back) (born 1947), former NFL and CFL running back
 Bobby Thompson (defensive back) (1939–2014), NFL and CFL defensive back
 Bobby Thompson (tackle), Canadian football player
 Bobby Thompson (baseball) (1953–2011), American Major League outfielder
 Bobby Thompson (comedian) (1911–1988), British stand-up comedian, actor and entertainer
 Bobby Thompson (musician) (1937–2005), American banjoist
 Bobby Thompson (racing driver) (born 1996), British racing driver
 Bobby Thompson (strongman) (born 1992), Strength athlete
 Bobby Thompson, alias of John Donald Cody, former attorney and convicted scam artist associated with the fraudulent United States Navy Veterans Association

See also
Robert Thompson (disambiguation)
Robert Thomson (disambiguation)